The Santa Marta brushfinch (Atlapetes melanocephalus) is a species of bird in the family Passerellidae. It is endemic to the Sierra Nevada de Santa Marta (Colombia).

Its natural habitats are subtropical or tropical moist montane forest and heavily degraded former forest.

References

Santa Marta brushfinch
Birds of the Sierra Nevada de Santa Marta
Endemic birds of Colombia
Santa Marta brushfinch
Santa Marta brushfinch
Santa Marta brushfinch
Taxonomy articles created by Polbot